Olivier Charroin and Stéphane Robert were the defending champions but decided not to participate that year.
Rameez Junaid and Simon Stadler won the final 6–3, 6–4 against Adam Hubble and Nima Roshan.

Seeds

Draw

Draw

External Links
 Main Draw

Poznan Open - Doubles
2012 Doubles